Cynognathia ("dog jaw") is one of two major clades of cynodonts, the other being Probainognathia. Cynognathians included the large carnivorous genus Cynognathus and the herbivorous traversodontids. Cynognathians can be identified by several synapomorphies including a very deep zygomatic arch that extends above the middle of the orbit.

Cynognathian fossils are currently known from Africa, Antarctica, Asia, Europe, North America and South America.

Taxonomy
Suborder Cynodontia
Infraorder Eucynodontia
(unranked) Cynognathia
Family Cynognathidae
Cynognathus
(unranked) Gomphodontia
Family Diademodontidae
Diademodon
Titanogomphodon
(unranked) Neogomphodontia
Family Trirachodontidae
Subfamily Trirachodontinae
Langbergia
Trirachodon
Subfamily Sinognathinae
Beishanodon
Sinognathus
Cricodon
Family Traversodontidae
Etjoia
Nanogomphodon
Scalenodon
Subfamily Traversodontinae
Traversodon
Luangwa
 Unnamed clade
Andescynodon
Pascualgnathus
Mandagomphodon
Subfamily Massetognathinae
Dadadon
Massetognathus
Santacruzodon
Subfamily Arctotraversodontinae
Arctotraversodon
Boreogomphodon
Plinthogomphodon
Habayia
Maubeugia
Microscalenodon
Mandagomphodon
Rosieria
Subfamily Gomphodontosuchinae
Gomphodontosuchus
Menadon
Protuberum
Ruberodon
Scalenodontoides
Exaeretodon
Siriusgnathus

See also
 Evolution of mammals

References

 
Early Triassic first appearances
Late Triassic extinctions
Tetrapod unranked clades
Taxa named by James Hopson